East Broad Street Presbyterian Church is a historic church at 760 E. Broad Street in the King-Lincoln Bronzeville neighborhood of Columbus, Ohio. It was built in 1887 and added to the National Register of Historic Places in 1987.

The church was originally designed in the Richardsonian Romanesque style by architect Elah Terrell. In 1907-08 it was expanded to designs by Frank Packard.

See also
 National Register of Historic Places listings in Columbus, Ohio

References

External links

Official website

Presbyterian churches in Ohio
Presbyterian Church (USA) churches
Churches on the National Register of Historic Places in Ohio
National Register of Historic Places in Columbus, Ohio
Romanesque Revival church buildings in Ohio
Churches completed in 1887
Churches in Columbus, Ohio
King-Lincoln Bronzeville
Broad Street (Columbus, Ohio)